Conor Martin (born 1994) is an Irish hurler who plays as a left corner-forward for the Kilkenny senior team.

Born in Urlingford, County Kilkenny, Martin first played competitive hurling at juvenile and underage levels with the Emeralds club. He subsequently joined the club's senior team. He won a Fitzgibbon Cup medal in 2015 while playing with University of Limerick.

Martin made his debut on the inter-county scene at the age of sixteen when he was selected for the Kilkenny minor team. He had two championship seasons with the minor team. He subsequently joined the Kilkenny under-21 team, winning aa Leinster medal in 2012. Martin joined the senior team during the 2016 league and won a Leinster medal in his debut season.

Honours

University of Limerick
Fitzgibbon Cup (1): 2015

Kilkenny 
National Hurling League (1): 2018
Leinster Senior Hurling Championship (1): 2016
Leinster Under-21 Hurling Championship (1): 2012

References

1994 births
Living people
Emeralds hurlers
Kilkenny inter-county hurlers